C-STEM (Center for Integrated Computing and STEM Education) is a UC Approved Educational Preparation Program for Undergraduate Admission for all UC campuses, meaning that participation in the C-STEM program is recognized in the UC admissions process as achievements that have explicitly prepared students for college and career. C-STEM has University of California A-G Program Status. High schools can easily add the A-G approved rigorous C-STEM curriculum to their own school’s A-G course lists to satisfy the UC/CSU admission requirements.

The C-STEM center is located on the University of California – Davis campus. The Center aims to transform computing, science, technology, engineering, and mathematics (C-STEM) education in both formal and informal K-14 programs through integrated learning, guided by two key objectives:
 Close the achievement gap by broadening participation of students traditionally underrepresented in computing and STEM related careers and post-secondary study.
 Develop students’ 21st century problem-solving skills to tackle real world concerns through integrated computing and STEM education.

The C-STEM Center has developed innovative educational technology C-STEM Studio  and RoboBlockly with computing in C/C++ for K-14 hands-on integrated learning.
C-STEM Studio is a platform for teaching computing, science, technology, engineering and mathematics with robotics (Barobo Linkbot, Lego Mindstorms NXT, EV3, and Arduino boards). RoboBlockly is a web-based robot simulation for learning coding and math. The Center has also developed integrated C-STEM curriculum that integrates computing and robotics into Common Core compliant math courses with coding and math activities for grades 1 through 9.

The vision of the C-STEM is to provide formal computing education for all K-12 students. C-STEM ICT Pathway provides 12-years computer science education for K-12 students. The Pathway includes robotics and math with coding activities in RoboBlockly and C/C++ for elementary school students, rigorous Computer Programming course for middle school students, and Computer Programming courses and AP Computer Science Principles for high school students.

One of goals for the C-STEM program is to provide formal computing education for all K-12 students.  The C-STEM Center studies how to use innovative computing and robotics technologies to increase student interest and help them learn STEM subjects with an emphasis on Algebra, a gatekeeper for high-school graduation, university education and careers in STEM fields. The C-STEM program helps close the achievement gap, engages traditionally unrepresented groups and at risk students in learning STEM subjects while preparing all students to be career and college ready.
The C-STEM Center provides unique professional development for teachers without any prior computing experience through C-STEM 2-Day Academy, On-Site Training, 1-Week Institute, and Train-the-Trainer program to integrate computing and robotics into their classroom teaching.

C-STEM Day 
The annual C-STEM Day is organized to build public awareness and advocate for Integrated Computing and STEM education. The C-STEM Center and its partners organize curriculum-based RoboPlay Competitions on C-STEM Day, typically held at the end of May each year, to further engage students in project-based team activities and to showcase their accomplishments and creativity in not only math and engineering, but also in writing, art, music and film production. Various C-STEM awards and scholarships are presented at the awards ceremonies to outstanding students to recognize their achievement and inspire them to pursue computing and STEM related careers and post-secondary study.

C-STEM Girls in Robotics Leadership (GIRL) Camps 
The one-week GIRL Camps in summer are designed to inspire girls in middle school to pursue computing and STEM related careers and post-secondary studies through near-peer mentoring with fun and exciting robotics activities. The girls also learn leadership and communication skills and meet inspiring women leaders working with science and technology to gain exposure to the variety of opportunities available to them.

C-STEM Annual Conference 
The annual C-STEM Conference on Integrated Computing and STEM Education provides a forum for educators to discuss the current educational landscape as well as issues related to integrated learning in computing and STEM education.  Participants share their views, experiences and best practices, are given opportunities to discuss and influence the future direction of integrated computing, and STEM education.

References

External links 
 C-STEM Center
 C-STEM Studio
 RoboBlockly

University of California
University of California, Davis